Barton crater is a 54-km (32-mi) diameter crater on Venus. It is the size at which craters on Venus begin to possess peak-rings instead of a single central peak. The floor of Barton crater is flat and radar-dark, indicating possible infilling by lava flows sometime following the impact. Barton's central peak-ring is discontinuous and appears to have been disrupted or separated during or following the cratering process. The crater is named after Clara Barton, the founder of the American Red Cross.

References

Impact craters on Venus
crater